Edwin John Fancey (1902–1980) was a British film producer and distributor. He owned the production company E.J. Fancey Productions, and the distribution company DUK. He specialised largely in producing supporting films and short subjects, often edited from or compiled from material appearing in earlier films produced by others, such as musical numbers or comedy routines.

Selected filmography
Producer
 The Balloon Goes Up (1942)
 Up with the Lark (1943)
 Soho Conspiracy (1950)
 Hangman's Wharf (1950)
 London Entertains (1951)
 Down Among the Z Men (1952)
 Behind the Headlines (1953)
 Forces' Sweetheart (1953)
 Flannelfoot (1953)
 Calling All Cars (1954)
 Johnny on the Spot (1954)
 Action Stations (1956)
 Flight from Vienna (1956)
 The Traitor (1957)
 Shoot to Kill (1960)
 Girls of the Latin Quarter (1960)

References

Bibliography
 Chibnall, Steve & McFarlane, Brian. The British 'B' Film. Palgrave MacMillan, 2009.

External links

1902 births
1980 deaths
People from Richmond, London
British film producers